Dębniki is one of 18 districts of Kraków, located in the southwest part of the city. The name Dębniki comes from a village of same name that is now a part of the district. 

Subdivisions of Dębniki 
Dębniki is divided into smaller subdivisions (osiedles). Here's a list of them.
 Ruczaj
 Osiedle Europejskie
 Osiedle Interbud
 Osiedle Zielona Galicja
 Osiedle Kolejowe
 Osiedle Panorama
 Kliny Zacisze
 Mochnaniec
 Skotniki
 Tyniec
 Zakrzówek
 Kapelanka

Population

References

External links
 Official website of Dębniki
 Biuletyn Informacji Publicznej

Districts of Kraków